The A 34 road is an A-Grade trunk road in Sri Lanka. It connects Mankulam with Mullaitivu.

The A 34 passes through Karupaddamurippu, Oddusuddan and Mulliyawalai to reach Mullaitivu.

References

Highways in Sri Lanka
Transport in Mullaitivu District